A Beer boot is a boot-shaped beer glass. Beer boots are commonly consumed communally and are popular with younger people as part of drinking games.

Production 

Because of their shape, beer boots are often made from blown or pressed glass.

Origin 
Shoe- or boot-shaped drinking containers have a long tradition; archaeologists have found examples at Urnfield culture sites in Unterhautzenthal near Korneuburg in Lower Austria or at the Glauberg in Hesse, Germany. In Asia Minor, shoe-shaped drinking vessels have been found dating to the early 2nd millennium BCE; others, dating to the early 1st millennium BCE have been found in Azerbaijan, Armenia, and Urartu sites near Lake Van. Similar glasses are attested into the middle ages. The modern beer boot takes its form from the Hessian boot, which saw military use into the 19th century. Drinking from shoes was a common hazing ritual in the military, and which spread further through German student fraternities.

Use 
Due to the size and volume, a beer boot is usually consumed communally. When drinking, if the toe of the boot is facing away from the drinker, a portion of the beer is held at low pressure in the toe. When the air reaches the toe, the beer can rush out into the face of the drinker.

The use of beer boots featured prominently in the 2006 film Beerfest.

References 

Beer glassware
Drinking culture
Student culture